Jannik Hastrup (born 4 May 1941 in Næstved, Denmark) is a Danish writer, director, producer, illustrator and animator. He is considered "Denmark's grand master of animation", as he is particularly well known for directing, animating and writing several animated films, occasionally with Flemming Quist Møller, including Benny's Bathtub, Samson & Sally, War of the Birds, The Monkey's and the Secret Weapon,  and A Tale of Two Mozzies. He also directed, wrote and animated a number of shorts following Cirkeline the elf.

Politics 
Jannik Hastrup was involved in films with socialist and social realism themes. One of them is the Cirkeline short film Flugten fra Amerika (Escape from America), which portrays a racist and poverty-filled New York City, followed by the Statue of Liberty with Richard Nixon's face and a rifle held above, and sympathetic portrayals of the Black Panther Party and a Native American tribe. The film was political enough that the public Danish Broadcasting Corporation refused to air it. Other works with political messages include  and Trællene.

Feature films 
  (2014)
 Cykelmyggen og Dansemyggen (2007)
  (2004)
  (2002)
  (2000)
  (1998)
  (1998)
  (1995)
 Fuglekrigen i Kanøfleskoven (1990)
  (1986)
 Samson og Sally (1984)
 The Thralls (1980)
 Bennys badekar (1971)

Short films 
  / Just a prank' (2015) 
  / Tefik, when you fall you get back up again (2014)
  / Jamila, if only I could fly (2013)
  / Solén, I always remember daddy (2013)
  / Circleen in Fandango (2010)
  / War & Peas (2006)
  (2005)
  / A Tale about The Guilty Conscience (2005)
  / Dog & Fish (2001)
  (1996)
  – 4 episoder (1995)
  / Song of the Sea (1993)
  / Aint Nobody here but us chickens (1992)
  / The Wonderfull World of Barney and Betty (1991)
 Take Care (1988)
  / Magic Mary and her puppets (1985)
  (1985)
 Roji Negra (1985)
  / The further adventures of the Ugly Duckling (1982)
 Trællene (The Thralls) – 9 episoder (1980)
  / Better rich and healthy than poor and sick (1977)
  / The Historybook – 9 episoder (1973)
  / The Wishbone (1972)
 Cirkeline / Circleen – 19 episoder (1967–71)
 Bennys Badekar / Bennys Bathtub (1970)
 Regnbuen / The Rainbow (1969)
 Flodhesten / The Hippo (1969)
 Det store slæderøveri (1969)
  / The boy and the moon (1968)
 It don't mean a thing (1967)
  / The General (1966)
  / Scoundrel (1966)
  (1966)
 Hvordan man opdrager sine forældre / How to bring up your parents (1966)
 Skorstensfejeren gik en tur (1965)
 Fagotten der fik ondt i maven (1965)
  (1964)
 Agnete og Havmanden'' (1964)

References

External links 
 
 Jannik Hastrup films on YouTube

1941 births
Danish animated film directors
Danish animated film producers
Danish animators
Danish film directors
Danish film producers
20th-century Danish illustrators
Living people
People from Næstved Municipality
Bodil Honorary Award recipients